Joakim Lindner (born 22 March 1991) is a Swedish footballer who plays for Varbergs BoIS as a midfielder.

He is son to the competitive sailor Magnus Olsson.

References

External links

1991 births
Living people
Swedish footballers
Allsvenskan players
Superettan players
IF Brommapojkarna players
Gröndals IK players
Östers IF players
Varbergs BoIS players
Association football midfielders
Footballers from Stockholm